The Body Punch is a 1929 American comedy film directed by Leigh Jason and written by Harry O. Hoyt, Clarence Marks, and Gardner Bradford. The film stars Jack Dougherty, Virginia Brown Faire, George Kotsonaros, Wilbur Mack, Monte Montague, and Arthur Millett. The film was released on July 14, 1929, by Universal Pictures.

Cast        
Jack Dougherty as Jack Townsend
Virginia Brown Faire as Natalie Sutherland
George Kotsonaros as Paul Steinert
Wilbur Mack as Peyson Turner
Monte Montague as Manager
Arthur Millett as Detective

References

External links
 

1929 films
1920s English-language films
Silent American comedy films
1929 comedy films
Universal Pictures films
Films directed by Leigh Jason
American silent feature films
American black-and-white films
1920s American films